Talking Feet is a 1937 British musical film directed by John Baxter and starring Hazel Ascot, Enid Stamp-Taylor and Jack Barty. It was made at Shepperton Studios. The film's sets were designed by John Bryan.

The Monthly Film Bulletin said of it, "the story is sentimental but human, and the atmosphere is genuine."

Plot
Hazel, the daughter of an East London fishmonger, is on her way to the rehearsal of a pantomime when her dog Patch is injured in a street accident. At a local hospital Dr Hood (John Stuart) manages to save Patch's life. When Hazel discovers that Dr Hood's hospital may have to close, she helps the local community to raise funds to save it. Mr Shirley (Davy Burnaby), the manager of a local theatre, is persuaded to allow his venue to be used for a fund-raising event. Hazel brings together a group of talented locals to create an exciting evening of entertainment. The fund-raising effort is a success, and so Dr Hood's hospital is saved.

Most of the second half of the film consists of the variety show, featuring various performers of the day.

Talking Feet was released on DVD by Renown Pictures on  11 Jun 2012.

Partial cast
 Hazel Ascot as Hazel Barker
 Jack Barty as Joe Barker
 Davy Burnaby as Mr Shirley
 Enid Stamp Taylor as Sylvia Shirley
 John Stuart as Dr Roger Hood
 Ernest Butcher as Thomas
 Edgar Driver as Titch
 Muriel George as Mrs Gumley
 Kenneth Kove as Lord Cedric Scattery
 Robert English as Lord Langdale
 Scott Sanders as Scotty McDonald
 Jennie Gregson as Mrs Barker

References

Bibliography
 Low, Rachael. Filmmaking in 1930s Britain. George Allen & Unwin, 1985.
 Wood, Linda. British Films, 1927-1939. British Film Institute, 1986.

External links

1937 films
British musical comedy films
1937 musical comedy films
1930s English-language films
Films directed by John Baxter
Films shot at Shepperton Studios
Films set in London
British black-and-white films
1930s British films